HMIS Oudh (J245) was a s built for the Royal Navy, but transferred to the Royal Indian Navy (RIN) during the Second World War.

Design and description
The Bangor class was designed as a small minesweeper that could be easily built in large numbers by civilian shipyards; as steam turbines were difficult to manufacture, the ships were designed to accept a wide variety of engines. The ship's complement consisted of 60 officers and ratings.

She was powered by two vertical triple-expansion steam engines (VTE), each driving one shaft, using steam provided by two Admiralty three-drum boilers.

The VTE-powered Bangors were armed with a QF 12-pounder (7.62 cm) anti-aircraft gun and a single QF 2-pounder (4 cm) AA gun or a quadruple mount for the Vickers .50 machine gun. In some ships the 2-pounder was replaced a single or twin  20 mm Oerlikon AA gun, while most ships were fitted with four additional single Oerlikon mounts over the course of the war. For escort work, their minesweeping gear could be exchanged for around 40 depth charges.

Construction and career
HMIS Oudh was ordered in 1940, and built by Garden Reach Shipbuilders & Engineers in India. She was commissioned in 1943, into the Eastern Fleet. She escorted a number of convoys until the end of the war.

Pakistan service

After the independence of India and the subsequent partition, she was among the vessels transferred to Pakistan and renamed PNS Dacca.

References

Bibliography
 

 

Bangor-class minesweepers of the Royal Indian Navy
Dacca
1942 ships
British ships built in India
World War II minesweepers of India